The 2010–11 Eredivisie Vrouwen was the fourth season of the Netherlands women's professional football league. The league took place from 2 September 2010 to 12 May 2011 with eight teams. FC Twente became champions for the first time, breaking AZ's three-year championship hegemony. The 84 matches of the season had a 44,710 total attendance.

Teams

On 10 March 2010 two new teams, VVV-Venlo and FC Zwolle were confirmed as participants, expanding the league from six to eight teams.

Source: Soccerway

Format
The season was played in a triple round-robin format, where all eight participating teams played each other three times (once at home, once away with the third confrontation defined by a lottery-system at the second half the season), a total of 21 matches each. The champion qualified to the UEFA Women's Champions League. There was no relegation system in place.

Standings

Results

First and second round

Third round

Top scorers

Source: vrouwenvoetbalnederland.nl

References

External links
Official website
Season on soccerway.com

Ned
1
2010